Henry Aldrich Haunts a House is a 1943 American comedy film directed by Hugh Bennett and written by Muriel Roy Bolton and Val Burton. The film stars Jimmy Lydon, Charles Smith, John Litel, Olive Blakeney, Joan Mortimer and Vaughan Glaser. The film was released on November 10, 1943, by Paramount Pictures.

Plot

Henry Aldrich swallows a serum by accident and ends up in a "haunted" house.

Cast 
Jimmy Lydon as Henry Aldrich
Charles Smith as Basil 'Dizzy' Stevens
John Litel as Sam Aldrich
Olive Blakeney as Alice Aldrich
Joan Mortimer as Elise Towers
Vaughan Glaser as Thomas Bradley
Jackie Moran as Whit Bidecker
Lucien Littlefield as Mr. Quid
Ray Walker as Detective Beamish

Production
Gail Russell was meant to play Elise but when she was cast in The Uninvited Paramount pulled her out of the role and cast Joan Mortimer instead.

References

External links 
 

1943 films
American black-and-white films
Paramount Pictures films
American comedy films
1943 comedy films
The Aldrich Family films
1940s English-language films
Films directed by Hugh Bennett
1940s American films